Gringai otherwise known as Guringay, is the name for one of the Australian Aboriginal people who were recorded as inhabiting an area of the Hunter Valley in eastern New South Wales, north of Sydney. They were united by a common language, strong ties of kinship and survived as skilled hunter–fisher–gatherers in family groups as a clan of the Worimi people.

Country
The Gringai lived round the Williams River, Barrington tops, Dungog, Barrington and Gloucester area and traded with the Paterson River Aboriginals The centre of their territory is on the land where the modern town of Dungog (perhaps "clear hills" in the Gringai dialect) lies.

History
Two people of the Gringai are known by that name as a result of their arrest and subsequent trials. Wong-ko-bi-kan (Jackey) and Charley were both arrested within a year or so of each other in the 1830s. He was judged guilty and sentenced to be transported to Tasmania for manslaughter after spearing John Flynn on 3 April 1834. Flynn died soon after. Flynn had been a member of an armed troop of nine settlers who went to the aborigines' camp at the Williams River at dawn to arrest some of them for culling sheep on their land. From another perspective, Wong-ko-bi-kan could be said to have been defending the native camp from armed intruders. Wong-ko-bi-kan's case elicited some sympathy from the presiding judge and several observers, because of the way the settlers had provocatively approached the native camp. Wong-ko-bi-kan died in his Tasmanian prison soon after, in October of that year.

Another Gringai, known only as Charley, was arrested in May 1835, soon after the incident with Wong-ko-bi-kan. In August of that year, he was deemed responsible for the death of five convict shepherds working for Robert Mackenzie, later premier of Queensland, at Rawden Vale, 26 miles west of Gloucester. Though generally understood by Europeans as an act of warfare, the trial interpreter, Lancelot Threlkeld, stated that Charley had acted after an Englishman had stolen a tribal talisman, called a muramai, and that the victims cohabited with a native woman, to whom the sacred object was shown. For this reason he implemented tribal law after a decision had been taken to that end by the elders. After his sentence he was brought back to Dungog and hung publicly as a warning to other Gringai. Local historian Michael Williams comments that, "Charley, ... was both an enforcer of one law and the victim of the enforcement of another set of laws." One later story, recounted in 1922 in the Wingham Chronicle, suggests that a raiding party set out to enforce the verdict by hunting other Gringai, managing to round some up and push them all over a cliff at Barrington.

Syphilis contracted from convicts, and other introduced diseases, took their toll. In 1847 alone, 30 Gringai children died of measles.

Ceremonial life
Key rites in the ceremonial life of the Gringai and related tribes, such as the keeparra, were described by Walter John Enright and R.H. Mathews in the late 19th century who managed to obtain permission to view and record them from the last remnants of the tribe.

One of the Gringai Bora rings used in the initiation is reported to have been at Gresford A karabari was reported as having been performed on the occasion of the appearance of a comet in the sky in 1845/1846.

Some words
 wilhurgulla (place of little sticks)
 erringi ( black duck)
 monduk (fertility)

Alternative names
 Goreenggai

Notable people
 Arabanoo.

Notes

Citations

Sources

Further reading 

Aboriginal peoples of New South Wales
Hunter Region